The Slovak women's national ice hockey team represents Slovakia at the International Ice Hockey Federation's IIHF World Women's Championships. The women's national team is managed by the Slovak Ice Hockey Federation (SZĽH). Slovakia has 847 female players in 2023 and is ranked 15th in the IIHF rankings.

Tournament record

Olympic Games
During qualification for the 2010 Winter Olympics in Vancouver, Slovakia defeated Bulgaria 82–0. This win is the most lopsided in the history of the IIHF. The Slovaks outshot Bulgaria 142–0, averaging a goal on 58.9 percent of its shots. Slovakia averaged one goal every 44 seconds. Janka Čulíková led Slovakia with 10 goals, while Martina Veličková scored nine. The game broke the Guinness World Record for the highest score in a single ice hockey game.

In the women's ice hockey tournament at the 2010 Winter Olympics, however, Slovakia lost to Canada 18–0, marking the most lopsided victory in Olympic competition.
 2010 – Finished in 8th place

World Championship
1999 – Finished in 15th place (7th in Pool B)
2000 – Finished in 18th place (2nd in Pool B Qualification)
2001 – Finished in 17th place (1st in Division I Qualification Group A)
2003 – Finished in 17th place (3rd in Division II)
2004 – Finished in 18th place (3rd in Division II)
2005 – Finished in 17th place (3rd in Division II)
2007 – Finished in 16th place (1st in Division II)
2008 – Finished in 11th place (2nd in Division I)
2009 – Finished in 10th place (1st in Division I, promoted to Top Division)
2011 – Finished in 7th place
2012 – Finished in 8th place (Relegated to Division IA)
2013 – Finished in 11th place (3rd in Division IA)
2014 – Finished in 14th place (6th in Division IA, relegated to Division IB)
2015 – Finished in 15th place (1st in Division IB, promoted to Division IA)
2016 – Finished in 14th place (6th in Division IA, relegated to Division IB)
2017 – Finished in 15th place (1st in Division IB, promoted to Division IA)
2018 – Finished in 15th place (6th in Division IA)
2019 – Finished in 15th place (5th in Division IA)
2020 – Cancelled due to the COVID-19 pandemic
2021 – Cancelled due to the COVID-19 pandemic
2022 – Finished in 13th place (3rd in Division IA)

European Championship
1995 – Finished 10th
1996 – Finished 10th

Team

2022 roster
Roster for the 2022 IIHF Women's World Championship Division I Group A. Player age at start of tournament, 24 April 2022.

Head coach:Tomáš SegíňAssistant coaches: Iveta Frühauf, Róbert Marton

References

External links

IIHF profile
National Teams of Ice Hockey

 
Women's national ice hockey teams in Europe
Ice hockey teams in Slovakia
1995 establishments in Slovakia